The 2023 Balearic regional election will be held on Sunday, 28 May 2023, to elect the 11th Parliament of the autonomous community of the Balearic Islands. All 59 seats in the Parliament will be up for election. The election will be held simultaneously with regional elections in eleven other autonomous communities and local elections all throughout Spain.

Overview

Electoral system
The Parliament of the Balearic Islands is the devolved, unicameral legislature of the autonomous community of the Balearic Islands, having legislative power in regional matters as defined by the Spanish Constitution and the Balearic Statute of Autonomy, as well as the ability to vote confidence in or withdraw it from a regional president.

Voting for the Parliament is on the basis of universal suffrage, which comprises all nationals over 18 years of age, registered in the Balearic Islands and in full enjoyment of their political rights. Additionally, Balearic people abroad are required to apply for voting before being permitted to vote, a system known as "begged" or expat vote. The 59 members of the Parliament of the Balearic Islands are elected using the D'Hondt method and a closed list proportional representation, with an electoral threshold of five percent of valid votes—which includes blank ballots—being applied in each constituency. Seats are allocated to constituencies, corresponding to the islands of Mallorca, Menorca, Ibiza and Formentera, with each being allocated a fixed number of seats: 33 for Mallorca, 13 for Menorca, 12 for Ibiza and 1 for Formentera.

Election date
The term of the Parliament of the Balearic Islands expires four years after the date of its previous election, unless it is dissolved earlier. The election decree shall be issued no later than the twenty-fifth day prior to the date of expiry of parliament and published on the following day in the Official Gazette of the Balearic Islands (BOIB), with election day taking place on the fifty-fourth day from publication. The previous election was held on 26 May 2019, which means that the legislature's term will expire on 26 May 2023. The election decree shall be published in the BOIB no later than 2 May 2023, with the election taking place on the fifty-fourth day from publication, setting the latest possible election date for the Parliament on Sunday, 25 June 2023.

The president has the prerogative to dissolve the Parliament of the Balearic Islands and call a snap election, provided that no motion of no confidence is in process and that dissolution does not occur before one year has elapsed since the previous one. In the event of an investiture process failing to elect a regional president within a sixty-day period from the first ballot, the Parliament shall be automatically dissolved and a fresh election called.

Parliamentary composition
The table below shows the composition of the parliamentary groups in the Parliament at the present time.

Parties and candidates
The electoral law allowed for parties and federations registered in the interior ministry, coalitions and groupings of electors to present lists of candidates. Parties and federations intending to form a coalition ahead of an election were required to inform the relevant Electoral Commission within ten days of the election call, whereas groupings of electors needed to secure the signature of at least one percent of the electorate in the constituencies for which they sought election, disallowing electors from signing for more than one list of candidates.

Below is a list of the main parties and electoral alliances which will likely contest the election:

Opinion polls
The tables below list opinion polling results in reverse chronological order, showing the most recent first and using the dates when the survey fieldwork was done, as opposed to the date of publication. Where the fieldwork dates are unknown, the date of publication is given instead. The highest percentage figure in each polling survey is displayed with its background shaded in the leading party's colour. If a tie ensues, this is applied to the figures with the highest percentages. The "Lead" column on the right shows the percentage-point difference between the parties with the highest percentages in a poll.

Graphical summary

Voting intention estimates
The table below lists weighted voting intention estimates. Refusals are generally excluded from the party vote percentages, while question wording and the treatment of "don't know" responses and those not intending to vote may vary between polling organisations. When available, seat projections determined by the polling organisations are displayed below (or in place of) the percentages in a smaller font; 30 seats are required for an absolute majority in the Parliament of the Balearic Islands.

Voting preferences
The table below lists raw, unweighted voting preferences.

Preferred President
The table below lists opinion polling on leader preferences to become president of the Balearic Islands.

Results

Overall

Notes

References
Opinion poll sources

Other

Balearic Islands
2020s
2023 regional elections in Spain